William Ian Thomas (born 18 September 1950) is a former Australian politician.

He was born in Perth and was a union official and ministerial officer before entering politics. In 1986 he was elected to the Western Australian Legislative Assembly as the Labor member for Welshpool, moving to Cockburn in 1989. From 1986 to 1989 he was Deputy Government Whip, and from 1989 to 1992 he was Parliamentary Secretary to the Cabinet. Following Labor's defeat in 1993 he was promoted to the front bench as Shadow Minister for Water Resources, Science and Technology and Energy, but he stepped down from the front bench in 1999 and retired from politics in 2001.

References

1950 births
Living people
Members of the Western Australian Legislative Assembly
Australian Labor Party members of the Parliament of Western Australia
21st-century Australian politicians